John Niemeyer may refer to:
 John H. Niemeyer, president of Bank Street College of Education 
 John Henry Niemeyer, German-born painter in the United States